The King Haakon VII 1905–1930 Jubilee Medal, also known as the King's Jubilee Medal, is a Norwegian award instituted in 1930 by Haakon VII of Norway in honor of the 25th anniversary of his accession to the throne. The medal has been conferred upon 397 people.

Description
The King Haakon VII 1905–1930 Jubilee Medal is made of silver and is 33 mm in diameter. The obverse depicts King Haakon VII with the inscription "HAAKON • VII •  NORGES • KONGE •" (Haakon VII King of Norway). The reverse shows the royal monogram. The medal was created by the engraver Ivar Throndsen. The medal is fitted to a royal crown and hangs from a red medal ribbon. The medal ribbon has a silver clasp reading "1905–1930."

Later the  King Haakon VII 1905–1955 Jubilee Medal, the King Haakon VII Commemorative Medal, and the King Haakon VII Centennial Medal were given the same design as the King Haakon VII 1905–1930 Jubilee Medal, but the ribbon clasps and inscriptions were modified to match the occasions they marked.

References

External links
Photo of the King Haakon VII 1905–1930 Jubilee Medal

Orders, decorations, and medals of Norway
Norwegian monarchy
Awards established in 1930
1930 establishments in Norway